Valdivia is a town and municipality in Antioquia Department, Colombia. Part of the subregion of Northern Antioquia.

History
Valdivia was inhabited by the Nutabes people upon the arrival of the Spanish colonists. In 1849 Spanish Pedro Vasquez acquired the land and cultivated the area, bringing labourers from other regions of Antioquia, that eventually began exploring and exploiting other land nearby. On February 5, 1892, became a corregimiento part of the municipality of Yarumal. Braulio Berrio was named its first Corregidor. In 1912 the Assembly of Antioquia segregated Valdivia from Yarumal assigned more land to its territory from other municipalities and made it a municipality.

Climate
Valdivia has an elevation moderated tropical rainforest climate (Af). It has very heavy rainfall year-round.

References
 University of Antioquia Library; Valdivia, Antioquia

Municipalities of Antioquia Department